Gaoyang (高陽) may refer to:

Gaoyang dialect (高陽方言), a dialect of Cantonese
Zhuanxu, or Gaoyang, legendary monarch of ancient China
Gao Yang, personal name of Emperor Wenxuan of Northern Qi

Places in China
Gaoyang County, Hebei
Gaoyang Township, Shunchang County, Fujian
Towns
Gaoyang, Chongqing, in Yunyang County
Gaoyang, Hebei, seat of Gaoyang County
Gaoyang, Henan, in Qi County, Kaifeng
Gaoyang, Shayang County, Hubei
Gaoyang, Xingshan County, Hubei
Gaoyang, Shaanxi, in Pucheng County
Gaoyang, Shanxi, in Xiaoyi
Gaoyang, Sichuan, in Wangcang County

See also
Gao Yan (disambiguation)